Vyacheslav Nikolayevich Kuznetsov (born 21 February 1947) is a Belarusian politician and diplomat.From 1992 to 1995, he was First Deputy Chairman of the Supreme Soviet of Belarus. In particular, during 26–28 January 1994 he was Acting Chairman of the Supreme Soviet, acting between the terms of Stanislav Shushkevich and Myechyslaw Hryb.

References

1947 births
Belarusian politicians
Members of the Supreme Council of Belarus
Belarusian diplomats
Living people